Essam Shqalo is a Syrian footballer.

References
http://www.goalzz.com/main.aspx?player=31266

Syrian footballers
Sportspeople from Damascus
Living people
1985 births
Association football defenders
Syrian Premier League players